Brazilian domestic rabbit is a medium-sized hardy breed originated in Brazil. They were developed as a meat breed.

See also

List of rabbit breeds

References

Rabbit breeds